Tilford can refer to:

Geography
Tilford, a small village in Surrey, England
Tilford, Kentucky, a town in Kentucky
Tilford, South Dakota, a town in the Piedmont Valley, South Dakota

People
Arthur Tilford (1903–1993), English footballer
Henry Morgan Tilford (1856–1919), American businessman
Shelby G. Tilford (1937–2022), American scientist
Terrell Tilford (born 1969), American actor

Others
HMS Tilford, a Ford-class seaward defence boat built for the British Royal Navy